C5a or C-5A may refer to:
 C5a receptor, a receptor for complement component 5a
 Complement component 5a, a human protein fragment, a chemotactic factor
 C5a peptidase, an enzyme
 the "A" version of the Lockheed C-5 Galaxy, a large military transport aircraft

See also
 C5 (disambiguation)